The Old Gladstone Gaol is a historic former prison in Gladstone, South Australia. It is listed on the South Australian Heritage Register.

The prison was built between 1879 and 1881. It was built to address chronic overcrowding in regional prisons in South Australia, and was built to a model prison plan by the then governor of Bristol Prison in England. It was designed to house both male and female prisoners from the beginning. The prison was built by Messrs. Sara and Dunstan, from local Gladstone stone. It was the first prison in South Australia to restrict prisoner contact with visitors, separating them "by iron gratings nine feet apart, with a warder between" so conversations could be overheard and contraband restricted. The first prisoner arrived on 8 June 1881. It was reported to be lightly used in its early decades; one report stated that "the only ‘lifer’ was a cat called Lady Jane Grey".

The prison saw a significant industrial dispute regarding sacked warders in 1921, which saw the involvement of future MP Frank Nieass as the secretary of their union. Issues had further arisen regarding the treatment of prisoners at Gladstone by the 1920s. In 1924, a released prisoner told The News that "any man who has served six months in Gladstone Gaol has been through hell". In 1925, Chief Secretary James Jelley inspected the jail to investigate issues around the "harshness of confinement". In 1939, it was taken over by the military for use as an internment camp, with all its prisoners transferred to Adelaide. Its use as an internment camp was not long lived; it was used as a military detention barracks for a period, but spent much of the next fifteen years in a state of disuse.

The prison was reopened in September 1952, after repairs and renovations, as a result of difficulties regarding the imprisonment of young offenders at Yatala Prison; it was to house mostly males under 25 years away from "hardened criminals" and teach them skilled trades, while decreasing overcrowding at Yatala. The prison closed permanently in 1975 due to its facilities having become outdated.

The prison was opened to visitors in 1978, and now forms a significant local tourist attraction. It is still falsely stated that a gallows was installed during its history and that a number of hangings had taken place at the prison; this is untrue, and the only hangings to take place in South Australia were in Adelaide, Port Lincoln, Fowlers Bay, Coorong, Franklin Harbour and Mount Gambier. Casual, guided and ghost tours of the site are available, while accommodation is offered in the former cells; it is also available for functions.

References

1881 establishments in Australia
1975 disestablishments in Australia
Defunct prisons in South Australia
South Australian Heritage Register
World War II internment camps in Australia
Museums in South Australia
Gladstone